The Maupeou family is a French aristocratic family from the Île-de-France of which several representatives played a role as Controller-General of Finances or Chancellors in the history of the French monarchy.

History 
Vincent Maupeou, the House of Maupeou's founder, was a civil law notary at the Châtelet of Paris in the middle of the 16th century. His three sons, Pierre, Michel and Gilles were ennobled together by letters patent from king Henry III of France on 12 January 1587.

In 1692, Gilles-François de Maupeou inherited the town of Ableiges, which he developed and promoted to great success. In 1692, the hereditary title of Count of Ableiges was bestowed upon him by King Louis XIV of France.

The Maupeou family came to prominence with René Nicolas, Keeper of the Seals and last Lord Chancellor of the Ancien Régime, under the reign of Louis XV of France. In 1771, René Nicolas de Maupeou, then Chancellor since 1768, exiled 130 members of the Parlement in what amounted to a coup d'état in order to take back the judiciary, thus restauring King Louis XV of France's authority over political reforms. At the time, the Dauphin, future Louis XVI of France, approved of the Chancellor's reforms despite a wave of hostility from the higher nobility and magistrates. Nonetheless, when Louis XVI acceded to the throne in 1774, and was quick to dismiss Maupeou and the reforms he had implemented. In November of the same year, when the old parlements were called back, he is to have said: « If the king wants to lose his crown, he is master ».

The Maupeou family has been granted the Honours of the Court in the 17th century.

Branches 
The house of Maupeou is divided in four main genealogical branches, two remain today :

 the Lords of Monceau, extinct,
 the Lords of Bruyères, remaining,
 the Lords of Sablonnières, extinct,
 and the Counts of Ableiges, remaining.

Notable members 

 Gilles de Maupeou (1553-1641), Controller-General of Finances.
 René Charles de Maupeou (1689-1775), first president of the parlement of Paris.
 René Nicolas de Maupeou (1714-1792), his son, keeper of the Seals and lord chancellor of France.
Jacques de Maupeou d'Ableiges (1899 - 1963), Senator of the French Republic
Pierre de Maupeou d'Ableiges (1910 - 1996), French resistant and officer, member of the French equestrian team at the 1948 Summer Olympics

References 

Maupeou